Herbert Charles Dainty (6 February 1879 – 1961) was an English footballer and manager. He was a restless player, who rarely stayed with one club for more than a year, but "served all his clubs with distinction".

Playing career
Dainty was born in Geddington, Northamptonshire and started his playing career with local club Kettering.

A different club each year
He joined Football League Second Division team, Leicester Fosse in August 1899 and in the summer of 1900, he moved to fellow Second Division team, New Brighton Tower. At the end of the 1900–01, despite finishing in a creditable fourth place, New Brighton Tower folded and Dainty returned to Leicester Fosse. In his second spell at Leicester, one of his teammates was Charles Webb who was later to play with him at Southampton (1904–1905) and Dundee (1905–1908).

He moved on again at the end of the season joining Southern League Northampton Town. His transient lifestyle continued when he joined Notts County at the end of the 1902–03 season to play for the first time in the First Division of the Football League.

Southampton
In May 1904, Dainty decided to move South to join Southern League champions Southampton.

According to Holley & Chalk's The Alphabet of the Saints, Dainty was "a worthy successor to previous Saints' centre-halves, Bowman and Chadwick. Bert was coolness personified and was at his best during desperate pressure around the goal area." He played alongside Saints' stalwarts, Samuel Meston and Bert Lee as Saints failed to repeat their previous season's performance, finishing in third place. At the end of the season Dainty decided to move on again, which "provoked an outcry in the town".

Dundee
He moved this time to Scotland where he joined Dundee in May 1905. He stayed at the club for six seasons, and was one of four Englishmen who helped Dundee to win the Scottish Cup in 1910.

Managerial career
A two-year spell at Bradford Park Avenue followed before moving back to Scotland in October 1913 to join Ayr United, where he served as player/manager. In April 1915, Dainty moved to Dundee Hibernian (later to become Dundee United) and similarly became player/manager shortly afterwards, becoming the club's second ever manager. Dainty relinquished managerial duties in 1917 and retired from playing the following year, staying at the club as secretary and then briefly in 1922 as chairman.

During World War I, Dainty stayed on Tayside, where he formed his own side known as "Dainty's XI" which played regular matches for charity against other Tayside teams.

Later career
After leaving Dundee Hibernian, Dainty travelled to South America as a coach, before returning to England as a coach with Ipswich Town from 1932 to 1934. He subsequently settled in the north west of England.

Herbert Dainty died in 1961.

Family
His grandson was Albert Dainty (1923–1979), who played for Preston North End, Stockport County, Southport and Morecambe, and went on to become Morecambe's manager for the 1955–56 season. He also made guest appearances during the war for Manchester United, Leeds United and Millwall.

Honours
Dundee
Scottish Cup: winner 1910
Scottish Football League runners-up: 1906–07 and 1908–09

References

1879 births
1961 deaths
People from Geddington
English footballers
Kettering Town F.C. players
Leicester City F.C. players
New Brighton Tower F.C. players
Northampton Town F.C. players
Notts County F.C. players
Southampton F.C. players
Dundee F.C. players
Bradford (Park Avenue) A.F.C. players
Ayr United F.C. players
Dundee United F.C. players
English Football League players
Scottish Football League players
Scottish Football League representative players
English football managers
Ayr United F.C. managers
Dundee United F.C. managers
Kettering Town F.C. managers
Scottish Football League managers
Dundee United F.C. directors and chairmen
Date of death missing
Chairmen and investors of football clubs in Scotland
Association football midfielders